Bashir Ahmed (born 1941) is a former Pakistani sportsman belonging to East Pakistan (now Bangladesh).

Early life
Ahmed was born in Mahut-tuli area in Dhaka. He studied in Armanitola Government High School. After he enrolled in the University of Dhaka, he took part in hockey, football, athletics and cricket.

Career
Ahmed served as the coach of the Bangladesh women's hockey team. He was an international hockey umpire and a referee in domestic football. He was also the chairman of Bangladesh Football Federation's Referees' Committee.

Awards
 Best Sportsperson Award by the East Pakistan Sports Press Association (1966)
 National Sports Award (1980) 
 Grameenphone-Prothom Alo Lifetime Achievement Award
 Star Lifetime Award (2016)

References

Living people
1941 births
Bangladeshi male field hockey players
Ahmed
Sportspeople from Dhaka
Recipients of the Bangladesh National Sports Award